Bates County Courthouse is a historic courthouse located in Butler, Bates County, Missouri. It was built in 1902 and is a 2 1/2-story, Richardsonian Romanesque style Carthage limestone building over a raised basement. The building measures 84 feet by 104 feet.  It features a central tower and four corner pavilions, all with ogee roofs. Also on the property is a contributing Doughboy statue, erected in 1927.

It was listed on the National Register of Historic Places in 2001. Architect George E. McDonald designed at least three other courthouses listed on the National Register.

References

County courthouses in Missouri
Courthouses on the National Register of Historic Places in Missouri
Richardsonian Romanesque architecture in Missouri
Government buildings completed in 1902
Buildings and structures in Bates County, Missouri
National Register of Historic Places in Bates County, Missouri